The IATA Operational Safety Audit (IOSA) programme is an internationally recognised and accepted evaluation system designed to assess the operational management and control systems of an airline. IOSA uses internationally recognised quality audit principles and is designed to conduct audits in a standardised and consistent manner. It was created in 2003 by IATA. The companies are included in the IOSA registry for a period of 2 years following an audit carried out by an organization accredited by IATA. The auditing standards have been developed in collaboration with various regulatory authorities, such as the Federal Aviation Administration, the Civil Aviation Safety Authority, Transport Canada and the Joint Aviation Authorities (JAA). IATA oversees the accreditation of audit organisations, ensure the continuous development of IOSA standards and practices and manages the IOSA registry.

References

External links 
IOSA Certification Web Page
IOSA Registry
IOSA Audit Organization 

Aviation safety
International Air Transport Association